Mark Kermode's Secrets of Cinema is a British TV documentary series on BBC Four. Presented by the film critic Mark Kermode, each 60-minute episode examines the tropes which come together to make a particular genre of cinema. An initial series of five episodes aired in 2018. A Christmas special was broadcast later that year, followed by two further specials in 2019. Series two and three, each consisting of three episodes, aired in 2020 and 2021 respectively. The programme has attracted positive reviews from TV critics.

Format
In each episode, Kermode takes a different genre of cinema and examines the elements that go up to make the perfect example of what a film in that genre would be like. Animated captions list each trope, with Kermode then explaining each one using examples from various movies.

Episodes

Series overview

Series 1 (2018)

Specials (2018–19)

Series 2 (2020)
In October 2019, the BBC announced that three more episodes of the series would be broadcast, covering Superheros, British history movies, and Spies.

Series 3 (2021)
In December 2020, the BBC announced that another three episodes of the series would be broadcast, covering British comedy, pop music movies, and cult movies.

Production
In an interview with Den of Geek, the chief writer of the series Kim Newman said that the reason for the creation of Secrets of Cinema was that: "there hasn't been a show like this before. Even in the deep history of TV discussions of cinema, they've always been about a director, a movie star, sometimes even a studio. One thing we've bent over backwards on is not to use the word genre in the title, or the publicity for the show. But that's what this is about!"

Releases
The entire first series of Secrets of Cinema was made free to watch on the BBC iPlayer from 12 December 2018 for several months. All previous series typically appear on iPlayer when repeated or a new series begins airing.

Reception

Secrets of Cinema received positive reviews from TV critics. Sean O'Grady wrote in The Independent concerning "The Heist" episode: "It was a compelling watch because gradually every crime "caper" you've ever seen suddenly slotted into his minimalist structure, albeit one that sometimes gets twisted." In The Observer, a newspaper Kermode also writes for, Euan Ferguson wrote in his review that, "I try to make it a rule never to be too nice to colleagues, let alone quote two in one piece, but I have to say Mark Kermode's Secrets of Cinema was an endlessly refreshing delight. [...] This was a splendid hour, could have run for three: you not only get Mark's insights, often lancet-sharp, you get to see a lot of snatches of films."

In The Herald, Alison Rowat wrote humorously in her review: "Who does Mark Kermode think he is? Coming into our living rooms with his Mark Kermode's Secrets of Cinema, a five-part series that could have gone to some poor, starving, blonde, Glaswegian TV critic who takes in film reviewing and washing on the side? How dare he, with chief writer Kim Newman, take film fans on a lucid, funny, fascinating, trip through the various genres, using perfectly chosen clips to show how each works?"

Writing in the Irish Independent, a reviewer commented that the experience of viewing the episode on "Disaster Movies" was "like sitting through a lecture from the world's coolest professor", whilst at the same time drawing attention to the role of Kim Newman as "the series' unseen and usually unsung hero".

References

External links

Main links

Episode links
Lists of titles featured in each episode at IMDb:
 Series 1: The Romcom / The Heist / Coming Of Age / Science Fiction / Horror
 Specials: Christmas Cinema Secrets / Oscar Winners: A Secrets Of Cinema Special / Disaster Movies
 Series 2: Superheroes / British History Movies / Spies
 Series 3: British Comedy / Pop Music Movies / Cult Movies

2018 British television series debuts
2010s British documentary television series
2020s British documentary television series
BBC television documentaries
Film criticism television series
English-language television shows